Ethan DeCaster (born October 27, 1994) is an American professional baseball pitcher.

DeCaster attended Creighton University for his first three years of eligibility, and then transferred to Duke University as a graduate transfer. As a freshman at Creighton, he developed his side-arm style of pitching as a result of an injury suffered. He finished his career as a Bluejay with a 2.42 ERA over 75 appearances, all coming in relief. At Duke, he was named to the Second Team NCBWA All-American team after going 6–0 in relief with a 1.34 ERA, and 57 strikeouts to just six walks.

DeCaster was drafted by the Tigers as an 18th round pick in the 2018 MLB Draft, and was assigned to the GCL Tigers shortly after the draft. After two games, a stint lasting eight days, DeCaster was called up to the Connecticut Tigers, where he spent under a month before moving up to the single-A West Michigan Whitecaps. He saw one game of action in Lakeland as well, for the Lakeland Flying Tigers, and finished the 2018 campaign with a cumulative 0.84 ERA over 32 innings pitched. Opponents only managed a .173 average off him.

DeCaster continued his rise through the Tigers minor league ranks in 2019 as after seven more games to start the season in Lakeland, he was called up to the Erie SeaWolves. Throughout the season, DeCaster shuffled between Erie and the Toledo Mud Hens, where he did not give up a run through his first six appearances. In less than 365 days, DeCaster was able to move from getting drafted to the Triple-A Mud Hens' roster.

DeCaster was released in December 2021.

References

External links

1994 births
Living people
Baseball pitchers
Baseball players from Saint Paul, Minnesota
Connecticut Tigers players
Creighton Bluejays baseball players
Duke Blue Devils baseball players
Erie SeaWolves players
Gulf Coast Tigers players
Lakeland Flying Tigers players
Toledo Mud Hens players
West Michigan Whitecaps players